Chaplain (Brigadier General) Charles Ray Bailey, USA was an American Army officer who was the 24th Deputy Chief of Chaplains of the United States Army from 2011 to 2015.

From 2007 to 2011, Chaplain Bailey served as the United States Army Europe Command Chaplain.

In May 2011, United States Secretary of Defense Robert Gates announced that Colonel Bailey had been nominated for promotion to brigadier general and reassignment as the Deputy Chief of Chaplains.

Education
Bailey earned a bachelor's degree in Business and Religion from Texas Wesleyan University in 1975. He then received a master's degree in Divinity from the Brite Divinity School at Texas Christian University in 1978. He later earned a master's degree in Strategic Studies from the United States Army War College in 2007.

Awards and decorations

References

External links

 Biography of Chaplain (Brigadier General) Charles R. “Ray” Bailey

Living people
Texas Wesleyan University alumni
Texas Christian University alumni
American United Methodist clergy
Gulf War chaplains
United States Army War College alumni
United States Army generals
Deputy Chiefs of Chaplains of the United States Army
Recipients of the Legion of Merit
Year of birth missing (living people)
20th-century American clergy